Charles Darlington "Buzz" Strode Jr. (born September 5, 1957) is a former professional tennis player from the United States.

Career
Strode was most successful at doubles, often playing beside his brother Morris "Skip" Strode. It was with his brother that he made the men's doubles quarter-finals at the US Open and Australian Open in 1982. His other Grand Slam quarter-final appearance in the men's doubles, at the 1985 Wimbledon Championships, was with South African Eddie Edwards. Strode and his brother won the 1982 Hong Kong and were also runners-up in Bangkok that year.

He made one Grand Slam mixed doubles final, which was with Leslie Allen at the 1983 French Open. They lost the final to fellow Americans Barbara Jordan and Eliot Teltscher.

Strode competed in the singles draw at three Grand Slam tournaments, but lost in the opening round each time, to Gustavo Tiberti at the 1982 French Open, Rod Frawley at the 1982 Australian Open and Mark Edmondson at the 1983 Australian Open. His best singles performance on the Grand Prix tennis circuit came at the Tokyo Outdoor tournament, where he had a win over Tim Gullikson, en route to the quarter-finals.

Grand Slam finals

Mixed doubles: 1 (0–1)

Grand Prix career finals

Doubles: 2 (1–1)

Challenger titles

Doubles: (7)

References

1957 births
Living people
American people of German descent
American male tennis players
Tennis people from California
Sportspeople from El Cajon, California
20th-century American people